Mission specialist (MS) was a position held by certain NASA astronauts. Mission specialists were generally assigned from the astronaut office pool to a limited field of a specific mission, such as those related to medical or engineering experiments.

Other functions on board were pilot, flight engineer and mission commander. Some Space Shuttle missions included personnel assigned as payload specialists in addition to standard mission specialists. While payload specialists were selected for a single specific mission, mission specialists were selected as astronauts first, and then subsequently assigned missions as NASA's needs dictated.

References 

Astronauts